(kanji for given name: 留美奈) is a Japanese retired mixed martial artist, famous for his career in the Shooto organization. In the past he fought mostly in the 155 lb division, but he moved down to the 145 lb division.

Mixed martial arts career
After graduating from high school, Sato had to spend a year as a ronin and started to train in shoot wrestling under Noboru Asahi and Noriaki Kiguchi in the Kiguchi Dojo, partnered with the Shooto promotion. He later moved to amateur wrestling after being admitted in the Nippon Sport Science University, and after graduating in 1994 and competing in the All Japan Amateur Shoot Championships, he joined professionally the company.

Shooto
After honing his submission skills under Satoru Sayama, Sato made his professional debut in MMA on December 7, 1994, winning over Michael McAuliffe with a calf slicer, the first time the move had been used in mixed martial arts. He ascended fastly in the roster by winning 10 straight matches, becoming a fan favourite for his aggressive and spectacular style of grappling. As soon as his fourth match, he submitted his opponent with a flying inverted triangle choke, and at his seventh, he gained worldwide fame by submitting the Brazilian jiu-jitsu black belt Ricardo Botelho, taking advantage of his guard usage to attack him with leglocks and submit him with a heel hook. Sato also defeated another big name of the art when he beat John Lewis, who he submitted in revenge for a match at the Vale Tudo Japan which ended in a draw. Sato would become a usual fighter for this event, representing Shooto in six out of the nine years it had place.

Sato's winning streak finally broke in 1998 when he lost a highly publicized match to Canadian Jiu-Jitsu Champion Joel Gerson by a surprising armbar in the first round of a non-title event in 1998. Sato avenged his defeat in the next Canadian Jiu-Jitsu open tournament the same year, where he faced Gerson again at the finals and submitted him with an ankle lock. After returning to Japan, Sato got also which is thought to be the fastest submission victory in MMA history when he submitted Charles Diaz in a mere five seconds with a flying armbar.

At Vale Tudo Japan 1998, Sato went against André Pederneiras of the Nova União in a vale tudo rules match. Sato suffered the first takedown, but he almost caught Pederneiras with a persistent armbar. The two exchanged minor strikes in Sato's guard before the Brazilian grappler decided to stand-up, and the match seemed to go stall from their respective positions. However, suddenly Pederneiras sidestepped Sato and landed a soccer kick to the head, following with heavy punches to the face for the doctor stoppage.

On May 29, 1999, he would fight former trainee Caol Uno for the vacated Shooto Welterweight Championship. Sato captured Uno's back mere two minutes into the match and pursued the rear naked choke, but despite threatening to lock the hold at several points, Uno managed to escape free. Going into the second round, Sato controlled the stand-up, opening a cut on the right side of his opponent's face and scoring a takedown, but he found himself having to defend from his guard while Uno capitalized to land ground and pound. At the third round, Uno started controlling the wrestling game and solidifying his assault to Sato's guard, and ultimately, when a clearly tired Rumina attempted a takedown, Caol took his back and locked a rear naked choke for the tap out.

Sato returned to Vale Tudo Japan in 1999 fighting Rafael Cordeiro, founder and instructor for the famed Chute Boxe team. The match was short, as Rumina scored a belly to belly suplex and right after locked a kneebar, making Cordeiro tap out.

Rumina rematched Uno in December 2000 for the title. In a cautious and tentative affair, Sato captured the back of his opponent while standing and attempted to lock a choke while Uno defended with a Kimura lock threat, but none was successful. However, when Sato finally released him, Uno capitalized on his bad position and landed a knee strike to the face and a right punch to the temple, knocking Sato out.

After his second defeat to Uno, Sato faced Marcio Ramos Barbosa of Barbosa Jiu-Jitsu, who had submitted Caol before the rematch. Sato won the fight by unanimous decision.

In December 2001, Sato faced rising star Takanori Gomi for the vacated Shooto World Lightweight Championship. Playing clinch to avoid his foe's dangerous striking, Rumina led the fight to the mat and besieged Gomi with submissions attempts, including armbars both from and against the guard, toeholds from inverted positions and an omoplata that almost finished the fight, but Takanori was consistently able of getting out of them. The second round saw Gomi landing damaging punches, as well as Sato utilizing an active guard to counterattack, and the striker eventually bypassing his defenses and controlling the pace. Come the third and final, Gomi landed the last punches against the guard before winning the bout by unanimous decision.

Despite PRIDE Fighting Championships and Ultimate Fighting Championship being both interested in signing him up, Rumina famously vowed to never compete in any other organization than Shooto (unless representing Shooto in special matches) until he won a title there. He won the Shooto Pacific Rim Lightweight Tournament on March 11, 2005, from Makoto Ishikawa, but still remained in the promotion until his retirement in May 2014.

On July 10, 2009, Sato competed in a grappling super fight at the UFC 100 Fan Expo Grappler's Quest against Ulysses Gomez, winning by submission with an inverted triangle choke/wrist lock combination.

Fighting style
Sato was primarily a grappler whose main strength was found in his offensive skills. He would attempt submissions relentlessly from unusual positions and entries, and was prone to try and often accomplish low percentage moves, among them flying holds, intrincated leglocks, and several variations of triangle chokes, which he utilized to set up ground and pound and other submissions. His technique was praised by Rickson Gracie, labelling it as "excellent." Though later years showed a weakened chin as his main weak spot, Sato was also an aggressive striker, sometimes indulging in moves like spinning backfists and axe kicks.

Championships and accomplishments
Shooto
Shooto Pacific Rim Lightweight Championship (1 Time, First)
1994 All Japan Amateur Shooto Championship, Welterweight Runner Up
1st Shooto Pacific Rim Lightweight Tournament Champion (March 11, 2005)
Ultimate Fighting Championship
Grapplers Quest at UFC Fan Expo Superfight Champion Las Vegas (July 10, 2009)

Mixed martial arts record

|-
| Loss
| align=center| 26–17–2				
| Hideo Tokoro
| TKO (punches & elbows)
| Vale Tudo Japan 2012	
| 
| align=center| 1
| align=center| 0:39
| Tokyo, Japan
| 
|-
| Loss
| align=center| 26–16–2				
| Nico Verresen
| KO (punch)
| Shooto: Shooto the Shoot 2011
| 
| align=center| 1
| align=center| 4:17
| Tokyo, Japan
| 
|-
| Loss
| align=center| 26–15–2				
| Masakatsu Ueda
| TKO (kick to the body)
| Shooto: Shootor's Legacy 3
| 
| align=center| 1
| align=center| 4:23
| Tokyo, Japan
| 
|-
| Win
| align=center| 26–14–2					
| Ryota Matsune
| TKO (knee & punches)	
| Shooto: The Way of Shooto 3: Like a Tiger, Like a Dragon	
| 
| align=center| 2
| align=center| 0:21
| Tokyo, Japan
| 
|-
| Win				
| align=center| 25–14–2					
| Corey Grant
| TKO (punches)
| VTJ 2009: Vale Tudo Japan 2009		
| 
| align=center| 1
| align=center| 3:20
| Tokyo, Japan
| 
|-
| Loss
| align=center| 24–14–2 				
| Takeshi Inoue
| TKO (punches)
| Shooto: Shooto Tradition Final
| 
| align=center| 1
| align=center| 4:41
| Tokyo, Japan
| For Shooto Lightweight (143 lbs.) Championship
|-
| Loss				
| align=center| 24–13–2					
| Hatsu Hioki
| TKO (punches)
| Shooto: Shooto Tradition 4
| 
| align=center| 1
| align=center| 3:32
| Tokyo, Japan
| 
|-
| Loss		
| align=center| 24–12–2 					
| Akitoshi Tamura
| Submission (north-south choke)
| Shooto: Shooto Tradition 1
| 
| align=center| 3
| align=center| 2:37
| Tokyo, Japan
| 
|-
| Loss		
| align=center| 24–11–2									
| Hideki Kadowaki
| Submission (rear-naked choke)
| Shooto: Back To Our Roots 5
| 
| align=center| 1
| align=center| 4:09
| Tokyo, Japan
| 
|-
| Win		
| align=center| 24–10–2					
| Augusto Frota
| TKO (cut)
| Shooto: Back To Our Roots 2
| 
| align=center| 1
| align=center| 1:21
| Tokyo, Japan
| 
|-
| Loss
| align=center| 23–10–2					
| Antonio Carvalho
| TKO (punches)
| Shooto: The Victory of the Truth	
| 
| align=center| 2
| align=center| 0:49
| Tokyo, Japan
| 
|-
| Loss			
| align=center| 23–9–2	 		
| Gilbert Melendez
| TKO (cut)
| Shooto: Alive Road
| 
| align=center| 1
| align=center| 1:32
| Kanagawa, Japan
| 
|-
| Win
| align=center| 23–8–2									
| Makoto Ishikawa
| Decision (unanimous)
| Shooto: 3/11 in Korakuen Hall
| 
| align=center| 3
| align=center| 5:00
| Tokyo, Japan
| For Shooto Pacific Rim Lightweight Championship
|-
| Win
| align=center| 22–8–2 	 								
| Katsuya Toida
| KO (punch)
| Shooto: Year End Show 2004
| 
| align=center| 2
| align=center| 1:21
| Tokyo, Japan
| 
|-
| Win
| align=center| 21–8–2  						
| Bao Quach
| Submission (armbar)
| Shooto Hawaii: Soljah Fight Night
| 
| align=center| 1
| align=center| 3:04
| Honolulu, Hawaii, United States
| 
|-
| Win
| align=center| 20–8–2 						
| Erikas Petraitis
| Technical Submission (triangle choke)
| Shooto 2004: 5/3 in Korakuen Hall
| 
| align=center| 2
| align=center| 2:20
| Tokyo, Japan
| 
|-
| Loss
| align=center| 19–8–2				
| Alexandre Franca Nogueira
| Submission (guillotine choke)
| Shooto: Year End Show 2003
| 
| align=center| 1
| align=center| 0:41
| Chiba, Japan
| 
|-
| Win
| align=center| 19–7–2					
| Ryan Ackerman
| Submission (heel hook)
| Shooto 2003: 6/27 in Hiroshima Sun Plaza
| 
| align=center| 1
| align=center| 2:12
| Hiroshima, Japan
| 
|-
| Loss
| align=center| 18–7–2					
| Joachim Hansen
| TKO (punches)
| Shooto: 3/18 in Korakuen Hall
| 
| align=center| 1
| align=center| 2:09
| Tokyo, Japan
| 
|-
| Draw
| align=center| 18–6–2	
| Takumi Nakayama
| Draw
| Shooto: Treasure Hunt 11	
| 
| align=center| 3
| align=center| 5:00
| Tokyo, Japan
| 
|-
| Loss
| align=center| 18–6–1		
| Javier Vazquez
| Decision (unanimous)		
| Shooto: Treasure Hunt 7
| 
| align=center| 3
| align=center| 5:00
| Osaka, Japan
| 
|-
| Loss
| align=center| 18–5–1
| Takanori Gomi
| Decision (unanimous)
| Shooto: To The Top Final Act
| 
| align=center| 3
| align=center| 5:00
| Chiba, Japan
| For Shooto World Welterweight (154 lbs.) Championship
|-
| Win
| align=center| 18–4–1			
| Marcio Ramos Barbosa
| Decision (unanimous)
| Shooto: To The Top 7
| 
| align=center| 3
| align=center| 5:00
| Osaka, Japan
| 
|-
| Loss		
| align=center| 17–4–1
| Caol Uno
| KO (punch)
| Shooto: R.E.A.D. Final
| 
| align=center| 1
| align=center| 2:21
| Chiba, Japan
| For Shooto World Welterweight (154 lbs.) Championship
|-
| Win
| align=center| 17–3–1 			
| Takuya Kuwabara	
| Technical Decision (unanimous)
| Shooto: R.E.A.D. 9
| 
| align=center| 2
| align=center| 5:00
| Kanagawa, Japan
| 
|-
| Win
| align=center| 16–3–1 				
| Yves Edwards
| Submission (rear-naked choke)
| SB 17: SuperBrawl 17
| 
| align=center| 1
| align=center| 0:18
| Honolulu, Hawaii, United States
| 
|-
| Win
| align=center| 15–3–1 					
| Rafael Cordeiro
| Submission (kneebar)
| VTJ 1999: Vale Tudo Japan 1999
| 
| align=center| 1
| align=center| 0:58
| Chiba, Japan
| 
|-
| Win
| align=center| 14–3–1
| Phil Johns
| Submission (toe hold)
| Shooto: Renaxis 5
| 
| align=center| 1
| align=center| 0:54
| Osaka, Japan
| 
|-
| Loss
| align=center| 13–3–1
| Caol Uno
| Submission (rear-naked choke)
| Shooto: 10th Anniversary Event
| 
| align=center| 3
| align=center| 4:02
| Yokohama, Japan
| For Shooto World Welterweight (154 lbs.) Championship
|-
| Win
| align=center| 13–2–1				
| Charles Diaz
| Submission (flying armbar)
| Shooto: Devilock Fighters
| 
| align=center| 1
| align=center| 0:06
| Tokyo, Japan
| 
|-
| Loss
| align=center| 12–2–1				
| André Pederneiras
| KO (soccer kick & punches)
| VTJ 1998: Vale Tudo Japan 1998
| 
| align=center| 1
| align=center| 4:20
| Chiba, Japan
| 
|-
| Win
| align=center| 12–1–1				
| Michael Buell
| Submission (armbar)
| Shooto: Shoot the Shooto XX
| 
| align=center| 1
| align=center| 0:31
| Tokyo, Japan
| 
|-
| Loss				
| align=center| 11–1–1
| Joel Gerson
| Technical Submission (armbar)
| Shooto: Las Grandes Viajes 2
| 
| align=center| 1
| align=center| 3:53
| Tokyo, Japan
| 
|-
| Win
| align=center| 11–0–1				
| John Lewis
| Submission (armbar)
| VTJ 1997: Vale Tudo Japan 1997
| 
| align=center| 2
| align=center| 1:23
| Chiba, Japan
| 
|-
| Win
| align=center| 10–0–1				
| Maurice Corty
| Submission (kimura)
| Shooto: Reconquista 4	
| 
| align=center| 1
| align=center| 2:01
| Tokyo, Japan
| 
|-
| Win
| align=center| 9–0–1				
| Alan Fried
| Submission (armbar)
| Shooto: Reconquista 3
| 
| align=center| 1
| align=center| 0:59
| Tokyo, Japan
| 
|-
| Win
| align=center| 8–0–1					
| Ali Mihoubi
| Submission (heel hook)
| Shooto: Reconquista 2
| 
| align=center| 1
| align=center| 2:21
| Tokyo, Japan
| 
|-
| Win
| align=center| 7–0–1 				
| Ricardo Botelho
| Submission (heel hook)
| Shooto: Reconquista 1
| 
| align=center| 3
| align=center| 1:24
| Tokyo, Japan
| 
|-
| Draw
| align=center| 6–0–1
| John Lewis
| Draw
| VTJ 1996: Vale Tudo Japan 1996
| 
| align=center| 3
| align=center| 8:00
| Chiba, Japan
| 
|-
| Win
| align=center| 6–0				
| Kyuhei Ueno
| Submission (rear-naked choke)
| Shooto: Vale Tudo Junction 2
| 
| align=center| 1
| align=center| 4:04
| Tokyo, Japan
| 
|-
| Win
| align=center| 5–0 				
| Masato Suzuki
| Technical Submission (armbar)
| Shooto: Vale Tudo Junction 1
| 
| align=center| 1
| align=center| 3:00
| Tokyo, Japan
| 
|-
| Win
| align=center| 4–0				
| Isamu Osugi
| Technical Submission (flying inverted triangle choke)
| Shooto: Vale Tudo Perception
| 
| align=center| 1
| align=center| 2:01
| Tokyo, Japan
| 
|-
| Win
| align=center| 3–0
| Ron Balicki
| Technical Submission (armbar)
| Shooto: Complete Vale Tudo Access
| 
| align=center| 1
| align=center| 2:14
| Saitama, Japan
| 
|-
| Win
| align=center| 2–0				
| Katsuaki Yano
| TKO (punches)
| Shooto: Yokohama Free Fight
| 
| align=center| 1
| align=center| 2:23
| Tokyo, Japan
| 
|-
| Win
| align=center| 1–0
| Michael McAuliffe
| Submission (calf slicer)
| Shooto: Vale Tudo Access 2
| 
| align=center| 2
| align=center| 2:18
| Tokyo, Japan
|

Mixed martial arts exhibition record

|-
| Draw
| align=center| 0-0-1
| Hayato Sakurai
| Technical Draw
| World＆Wild 1
| 
| align=center| 1
| align=center| 3:00
| Tokyo, Japan
| 
|-

Submission grappling record
KO PUNCHES
|- style="text-align:center; background:#f0f0f0;"
| style="border-style:none none solid solid; "|Result
| style="border-style:none none solid solid; "|Opponent
| style="border-style:none none solid solid; "|Method
| style="border-style:none none solid solid; "|Event
| style="border-style:none none solid solid; "|Date
| style="border-style:none none solid solid; "|Round
| style="border-style:none none solid solid; "|Time
| style="border-style:none none solid solid; "|Notes
|-
|Win|| Hideki Mizutani || Submission (neckscissors) || All Japan Masters 3 || 2015|| || ||
|-
|Win|| Hirokazu Saito || Submission (achilles lock) || All Japan Masters 3 || 2015|| || ||
|-
|Loss|| Yoshihiko Matsumoto || Points || Shooto Gig Saitama 01 || 2009|| || ||
|-
|Win|| Ulysses Gomez || Submission (reverse triangle wrist lock) || UFC Fan Expo || 2009|| || ||
|-
|Win|| Masakazu Imanari || Submission (rear-naked choke) || 7th All Japan Combat Wrestling Championship -76 kg || 2001|| || || Finals
|-
|Win|| Shigefumi Matsunaga || Submission (rear-naked choke) || 7th All Japan Combat Wrestling Championship -76 kg || 2001|| || || Semi-finals
|-
|Win|| Torushi Kuroda || Submission (kneebar) || 7th All Japan Combat Wrestling Championship -76 kg || 2001|| || || Quarter-finals
|-
|Win|| Yuki Takaya || Points || 7th All Japan Combat Wrestling Championship -76 kg || 2001|| || ||Opening round
|-
|Loss|| Tito Ortiz || Technical Submission (north-south choke) || ADCC 2000 Openweight || 2000|| || ||First round
|-
|Loss|| Vítor Ribeiro || Points || ADCC 2000 –77 kg|| 2000|| || ||First round
|-
|Loss|| Marcio Feitosa || Points || Canadian Jiu-Jitsu|| 1998|| || ||Finals
|-
|Win|| Joel Gerson || Submission (ankle lock) || Canadian Jiu-Jitsu || 1998|| || ||
|-

Kickboxing record 

|-
|
|Win
| Mike Campbell
|Shoot Boxing 2009: Takeshi Do Bushido Tag 1
|Tokyo, Japan
|TKO (corner stoppage)
|align="center"|2
|align="center"|2:14
|1-0
|-
| colspan=9 | Legend:

See also 
List of male mixed martial artists

References

External links
Roots (in Japanese)
K'z Factory (in Japanese)
 
 Rumina Sato INSPIRIT Profile

1973 births
Living people
People from Odawara
Japanese male mixed martial artists
Japanese catch wrestlers
Japanese practitioners of Brazilian jiu-jitsu
Featherweight mixed martial artists
Mixed martial artists utilizing shoot wrestling
Mixed martial artists utilizing catch wrestling
Mixed martial artists utilizing shootboxing
Mixed martial artists utilizing Brazilian jiu-jitsu
Sportspeople from Kanagawa Prefecture
Sportspeople from Akita Prefecture